Goodenough Glacier is a broad sweeping glacier to the south of the Batterbee Mountains, flowing from the west shore of Palmer Land, Antarctica, into George VI Sound and the George VI Ice Shelf. It was discovered in 1936 by A. Stephenson, W.L.S. Fleming, and George C.L. Bertram of the British Graham Land Expedition under John Rymill, while exploring George VI Sound, and was named by Rymill after Margaret Goodenough, wife of Admiral Sir William Goodenough, the latter being one of Rymill's principal supporters in raising funds for the expedition.

Bell Rock is a very conspicuous and isolated nunatak located on the glacier.

References

Glaciers of Palmer Land